Awar is one of the five sons of Iblis, mentioned by Muslim ibn al-Hajjaj.  He is a devil who encourages debauchery.  His four brothers are named: Dasim (داسم), Zalambur (زلنبور), Sut (مسوط), and Tir (ثبر). Each of them is linked to another psychological function, which they try to encourage to prevent humans spiritual development.

References

Demons in Islam